Partnering may refer to:

Business partnering
Construction partnering
Dance partnering
Domestic partners